Istgah-e Sabz Ab (also Romanized as Īstgāh-e Sabz Āb; also known as Sabzāb) is a village in Howmeh Rural District, in the Central District of Andimeshk County, Khuzestan Province, Iran. At the 2006 census, its population was 45, in 9 families.

References 

Populated places in Andimeshk County